Crook County is a county in the northeastern section of the U.S. state of Wyoming. As of the 2020 United States Census, the population was 7,181, making it the third-least populous county in Wyoming. Its county seat is Sundance.

History
Crook County was created by the legislature of the Wyoming Territory on December 8, 1875, from portions of Albany and Laramie Counties. It was organized in 1888.

Crook County was named for Brigadier General George Crook, an army commander during the Indian Wars. In 1890, Crook County lost territory when Weston County was created. Campbell County was formed with land ceded by Crook County in 1911.

Geography
The lowest point in the state of Wyoming is located on the Belle Fourche River in Crook County, where it flows out of Wyoming and into South Dakota.

Devils Tower National Monument is located in the Bear Lodge Mountains in Crook County.

The Missouri Buttes, at the northwestern end of the Black Hills, are located in the county, 3.5 miles northwest of Devils Tower.

Major highways

Adjacent counties

 Butte County, South Dakota – northeast
 Lawrence County, South Dakota – east
 Weston County – south
 Campbell County – west
 Powder River County, Montana – northwest
 Carter County, Montana – north

National protected areas
 Black Hills National Forest (part)
 Devils Tower National Monument
 Thunder Basin National Grassland (part)

Demographics

2000 census
As of the 2000 United States Census, of 2000, there were 5,887 people, 2,308 households, and 1,645 families in the county. The population density was 2 people per square mile (1/km2). There were 2,935 housing units at an average density of 1.0 per square mile (0.4/km2). The racial makeup of the county was 97.86% White, 0.05% Black or African American, 1.02% Native American, 0.07% Asian, 0.25% from other races, and 0.75% from two or more races. 0.92% of the population were Hispanic or Latino of any race. 34.1% were of German, 14.6% English, 7.8% Irish and 6.8% American ancestry.

There were 2,308 households, out of which 32.30% had children under the age of 18 living with them, 62.30% were married couples living together, 5.40% had a female householder with no husband present, and 28.70% were non-families. 24.90% of all households were made up of individuals, and 10.30% had someone living alone who was 65 years of age or older. The average household size was 2.51 and the average family size was 3.01.

The county population contained 26.90% under the age of 18, 6.60% from 18 to 24, 24.60% from 25 to 44, 27.20% from 45 to 64, and 14.70% who were 65 years of age or older. The median age was 40 years. For every 100 females there were 102.40 males. For every 100 females age 18 and over, there were 101.80 males.

The median income for a household in the county was $35,601, and the median income for a family was $43,105. Males had a median income of $34,483 versus $18,967 for females, indicating a relatively high level of income inequality based on gender. The per capita income for the county was $17,379.  About 7.8% of families and 9.10% of the population were below the poverty line, including 9.90% of those under age 18 and 11.80% of those age 65 or over.

2010 census
As of the 2010 United States Census, there were 7,083 people, 2,921 households, and 2,016 families in the county. The racial makeup of the county was 97.2% white, 0.7% American Indian, 0.2% black or African American, 0.2% Asian, 0.6% from other races, and 1.2% from two or more races. Those of Hispanic or Latino origin made up 2.0% of the population. In terms of ancestry, 38.8% were German, 16.5% were English, 14.5% were Irish, 9.5% were Swedish, and 3.8% were American.

Of the 2,921 households, 28.4% had children under the age of 18 living with them, 59.2% were married couples living together, 6.5% had a female householder with no husband present, 31.0% were non-families, and 25.0% of all households were made up of individuals. The average household size was 2.41 and the average family size was 2.90. The median age was 43.6 years.

The median income for a household in the county was $49,890 and the median income for a family was $55,765. Males had a median income of $47,821 versus $32,217 for females. The per capita income for the county was $24,520. About 6.5% of families and 7.8% of the population were below the poverty line, including 10.8% of those under age 18 and 8.0% of those age 65 or over.

Politics
Crook County is one of the most overwhelmingly Republican counties in the nation, both in state and federal elections. The last Democratic candidate to carry the county was Franklin D. Roosevelt in 1932, and indeed Roosevelt in the following election – when he lost to Alf Landon by five percentage points – constitutes the last Democrat to pass forty percent. In the last ten Presidential elections the Democratic candidate has consistently received less than 23.5% of the county's vote. In the 2016 Presidential election, Crook County was the most Republican county in the most Republican state.

In the Wyoming Senate the county is represented by Republican Ogden Driskill since 2011. In the Wyoming House of Representatives it has been represented by Republican Chip Neiman since 2021.

Communities

Towns

 Hulett
 Moorcroft
 Pine Haven
 Sundance (county seat)

Census-designated place
 Beulah

Unincorporated communities

 Aladdin
 Alva
 Carlile
 Colony
 Devils Tower
 Farrall
 Moskee
 New Haven
 Oshoto
 Sand Creek Crossing
 Stroner

See also
National Register of Historic Places listings in Crook County, Wyoming
Wyoming
List of cities and towns in Wyoming
List of counties in Wyoming
Wyoming statistical areas

References

External links

 
1875 establishments in Wyoming Territory
Populated places established in 1875
Black Hills